Mark E. Robinson is an American attorney and former Massachusetts government official who served as Secretary of Administration and Finance of Massachusetts from 1992 to 1994.

Career 
Robinson had served as the Massachusetts Port Authority, and in 1992, he was nominated by George H. W. Bush to serve as U.S. Attorney for Massachusetts. He now works for the Mintz Levin firm.

Personal life 
Robinson holds a bachelor’s degree from Duke University and a Juris Doctor from Boston University.

References 

Year of birth missing (living people)
Living people
State cabinet secretaries of Massachusetts
Duke University School of Law alumni
Boston University School of Law alumni